Dewan Bahadur or Diwan Bahadur was a title of honour awarded during British rule in India. It was awarded to individuals who had performed faithful service or acts of public welfare to the nation. From 1911 the title was accompanied by a special Title Badge. Dewan literally means Prime Minister in Indian context and Bahadur means brave. 

This title was above Rao Bahadur title and people with Rao Bahadur could be elevated to status of Diwan Bahadur. 

Further, the Prime Ministers of Indian Princely States were known as Dewan/Diwan. They were also given or promoted directly to the title of Dewan Bahadur by British authorities on being appointed Dewan, to suit their post.

The Dewan Bahadur and other similar titles issued during British Raj were disestablished in 1947 upon independence of India.

List of people with Dewan Bahadur title

 R. Raghunatha Rao – Diwan of Indore State from 1875 to 1880 and 1886 to 1888.
 R. Ramachandra Rao
 N. Pattabhirama Rao
 K. Rangachari
 V. Nagam Aiya of Travancore
 I. X. Pereira
 K. P. Puttanna Chetty
 D. D. Thacker, of Jharia
 Ketoli Chengappa, Chief Commissioner of Kodagu (Coorg)
 C. S. Ratnasabhapathy Mudaliar, CBE – Indian industrialist and politician.
 R. Venkata Ratnam of Madras
 E.K Krishnan of Madras
 P. T. Kumarasamy Chetty of Madras
 T. Namberumal Chetty of Madras
 Rettamalai Srinivasan of Madras
 S. Venkataramadas Nayudu – Diwan of the Pudukkottai state from 1899 to 1909
 V. Thirumalai Pillai of Madras
 P. Khalifullah Sahib Rowther – Dewan of Pudukkottai State from 1941 to 1947
 Lodd Govindoss Chathurbhujadoss

See also
Rai Bahadur
Rai Sahib
Raj Ratna
Khan Bahadur
Khan Sahib
Divan
Dewan
Title Badge (India)

References

Titles in India
Orders, decorations, and medals of British India
Men's social titles
Orders, decorations, and medals of India
Awards disestablished in 1947